Sea change, seachange or The Sea Change may refer to:
 Sea change, an English idiomatic expression for broad transformation, drawn from a phrase in Shakespeare's The Tempest

Literature
 Sea Change (Parker novel), a Jesse Stone novel by Robert B. Parker (2006)
 Sea Change (Armstrong novel), a children's book by Richard Armstrong (1948)
 Sea Change (Powlik novel), a thriller by James Powlik (1999)
 "The Sea Change", a short story by Ernest Hemingway in the collection Winner Take Nothing (1933)
 The Sea Change, a book by historian H. Stuart Hughes (1975)
 Sea Change, a young-adult novel by Aimee Friedman (2009)
 Sea Change, a poetry collection by Jorie Graham (2008)
 Sea Change, a short story by Thomas N. Scortia (1956)
 A Sea-Change, a play by William Dean Howells (1888)

Music
 Sea Change (album), a 2002 album by Beck
 Seachange (band), a band from Nottingham, United Kingdom
 "Sea Change", a song by Turin Brakes from Outbursts

Film and television
 The Sea Change, a 1998 British-Spanish comedy film
 Jesse Stone: Sea Change, the fourth film in the Jesse Stone series, 2007
 SeaChange, an Australian drama television series
 "Sea Change" (The Transformers), a television episode

Other
 Seachange (demography), human migration from cities in favour of rural coastal communities
 Seachange (horse) (born 2002), New Zealand thoroughbred racehorse
 Sea Change (Northeast Harbor, Maine), U.S., a historic summer house
 SeaChange International, a video services software company, headquartered in Acton, Massachusetts.

See also
 The Real Seachange, an Australian reality television series